Jew Peak is a summit in Sanders County, Montana, in the United States. Jew Peak is the 2,010th highest mountain in the state of Montana.

The name Jew Peak was likely meant to honor a person.

References

Mountains of Sanders County, Montana
Mountains of Montana